The Cinema of Belarus began on 17 December 1924 with the creation by decree of what later became Belarusfilm studio. The studio was moved to Minsk in 1939. Film production was interrupted by World War II, and restarted in 1946, when the studio assumed its current name.

Most of the output has been in Russian rather than Belarusian.

Belarusfilm is also a co-organizer of the Listapad film festival held in Minsk, Belarus in November.

Film studios

Cubastudio
Belarusfilm
Belsat
Beltelefilm
Navigator studio
Partyzanfilm

Festivals

DOTYK
Listapad

Notable films

 1975 The Adventures of Buratino
 1977 About Red Riding Hood
 1985 Come and See
 1993 Me Ivan, You Abraham  
 1996 From Hell to Hell 
 2001 In August of 44 
 2003 Anastasia Slutskaya
 2003 Babiy Yar 
 2003 Kola (short film)
 2004 On the Nameless Height
 2004 Dunechka 
 2004 Mysterium Occupation  
 2006 A Lesson of Belarusian (documentary film)
 2006 Franz + Polina 
 2010 Fortress of War
 2010 Massacre
 2012 Above the Sky
 2012 Viva Belarus! 
 2012 In the Fog 
 2014 The Interrogation of Muscular P.O.W. 
 2015 GaraSh
 2016 PARTY-ZAN film
 2018 Crystal Swan

Actors
Dzmitry Papko
Vladimir Gostyukhin
Viktar Shalkevich
Petr Shelokhonov
Rostislav Yankovsky
Irina Medvedeva

Directors
Serguei Kouchnerov
Vladimir Kozlov
Vladimir Motyl
Solomon Shulman
Yelena Trofimenko
Yuriy Khashchevatskiy

References